So-hyun is a Korean feminine given name. The meaning differs based on the hanja used to write each syllable of the name. There are 45 hanja with the reading "so" and 68 hanja with the reading "hyun" on the South Korean government's official list of hanja which may be used in given names.

People with this name include:
SoHyun Bae (born 1965), South Korean-born American painter
Park So-hyun (born 1971), South Korean actress
Kim So-hyun (actress, born 1975), South Korean actress
Kwon So-hyun (actress) (born 1987), South Korean actress
Cho So-hyun (born 1988), South Korean football player
Kwon So-hyun (born 1994), South Korean singer, former member of 4Minute
Kim So-hyun (born 1999), South Korean actress
An So-hyun (born 2001), South Korean figure skater
Park So-hyun (tennis) (born 2002), South Korean tennis player

Fictional characters:
Oh So-hyun from 2020 TV series 18 Again

See also
Crown Prince Sohyeon (birth name I Wang; 1612–1645), first son of King Injo of Joseon
List of Korean given names

References

Korean feminine given names